New Gods: Yang Jian is a Chinese 3D animated fantasy action film directed by Zhao Ji and written by Mu Chuan. The film is based on the character of Yang Jian from the Ming dynasty novel Investiture of the Gods, and was released on August 19, 2022, as a prequel to the 2021 film, New Gods: Nezha Reborn.

The film's distribution rights in North America was bought by GKIDS who also produced an English dub of the film. The GKIDS version was released on January 20, 2023.

Plot 
Thirteen years after imprisoning his own sister underneath a mountain, Erlang Shen, a god known for his all-seeing third eye, now works as a bounty hunter. A woman sets him on a quest to prevent his nephew, Chenxiang, from obtaining a magical lantern that holds great power.

Characters 

 (English)

 (English)

 (English)

 (English)

Voiced by James Sie (English)

References 

Chinese animated fantasy films
2022 animated films
Mandarin-language films
Works based on Investiture of the Gods